Henry "Enrique" Tarrio (born ) is an American activist, former FBI informant, and convicted felon who serves as chairman of the Proud Boys, a far-right, neo-fascist, and exclusively male organization that promotes and engages in political violence in the United States. Tarrio was indicted in June 2022 on seditious conspiracy charges, along with four other Proud Boy leaders, for his alleged role in the 2021 United States Capitol attack.

Tarrio, who is of Afro-Cuban background, served as the Florida state director of the grassroots organization Latinos for Trump. In 2020, Tarrio was a candidate in the Republican primary election for Florida's 27th congressional district, but withdrew. According to a former federal prosecutor and the transcripts of a 2014 federal court proceeding, Tarrio had previously served as an informant to both federal and local law enforcement.

Proud Boys 

Tarrio volunteered at a Miami event for far-right commentator Milo Yiannopoulos in May 2017 when he encountered a member of the Proud Boys, who encouraged him to join the organization. In August 2017, Tarrio attended the Unite the Right rally in Charlottesville, Virginia. He said he was there to protest the removal of Confederate monuments and memorials.

In 2018, Tarrio became a fourth-degree member of the Proud Boys, a distinction reserved for those who get into a physical altercation "for the cause"; he punched a person who was believed to be aligned with antifa. He assumed the role of chairman for the organization on November 29, 2018, succeeding Jason Lee Van Dyke, who held the position for two days, and Van Dyke's predecessor Gavin McInnes. McInnes involved Tarrio as a prospective electoral candidate, and in that capacity both conferred with Trump right-wing confidants Steve Bannon (whom Trump later pardoned) and Sebastian Gorka.

Tarrio helped organize the End Domestic Terrorism rally held in Portland, Oregon, on August 17, 2019. The event, co-organized by Joe Biggs, was framed as a response to the June 2019 assault on conservative blogger Andy Ngo.

Tarrio attended a pro-Trump march on December 12, 2020, in Washington, D.C., along with around two hundred other Proud Boys. He was arrested in connection with the march on a misdemeanor destruction of property charge related to the burning of a Black Lives Matter banner stolen from a church. In August 2021 he was sentenced to five months in jail for the incident and on a weapons charge.

In January 2021, Reuters reported that Tarrio had been an informant to both federal and local law enforcement between 2012 and 2014. This report contributed to rifts within the Proud Boys. In the aftermath of the 2021 United States Capitol attack, chapters of the organization split with the national group. Several chapters across three states pointed to Tarrio's past as an informant as a reason for their splintering from the national organization. The Oklahoma chapter also split from the national group because of Tarrio, blaming his "failure to take disciplinary measures [which] have jeopardized our brothers' safety and the integrity of our brotherhood". Tarrio himself did not participate in the attack, having been arrested two days earlier in Washington, D.C., and ordered to stay away from the city. Later, he said he would neither "support" nor "condemn" the attack and did not "sympathize" with lawmakers.

Career 
After 2004, Tarrio relocated to a small town in North Florida to run a poultry farm. He later returned to Miami. He has also founded a security equipment installation firm and another providing GPS tracking for companies. Tarrio owns a Miami T-shirt business, known as the 1776 Shop, an online vendor for right-wing merchandise. Slate described the 1776 Shop as a "freewheeling online emporium for far-right merch" that sells a range of Proud Boys gear including shirts stating "Pinochet did nothing wrong".

Political views 
In regard to his views on extremist groups and ideologies, Tarrio has been quoted as saying, "I denounce white supremacy. I denounce anti-Semitism. I denounce racism. I denounce fascism. I denounce communism and any other -ism that is prejudiced towards people because of their race, religion, culture, tone of skin." In regard to his own ethnicity, he has said, "I'm pretty brown, I'm Cuban. There's nothing white supremacist about me."

After Tarrio confronted and shouted expletives at House Speaker Nancy Pelosi in Coral Gables in late 2018, the chairman of the Miami-Dade Republican Party apologized and U.S. Senator Marco Rubio compared the disruptors to the "repudiation mobs Castro has long ago used in Cuba."

In 2018, Twitter removed Tarrio's account, along with others related to the Proud Boys, citing how platform policy prohibited accounts related to violent extremist groups. The following year, Twitter detected and removed another account that Tarrio created to evade the suspension.

Tarrio said he is a close friend of Roger Stone, a Trump ally who is a high-profile Proud Boys supporter. After Stone was arrested in January 2019, Tarrio appeared outside the courtroom in a shirt emblazoned with the message "Roger Stone did nothing wrong". The two appeared in a video together made on December 11, 2020, the day before a "Stop the Steal" rally where Tarrio stood on stage with Stone. On December 23, 2020, Trump pardoned Stone, whose prison sentence he had previously commuted.

Tarrio began a run for Congress for Florida's 27th district in 2020, but withdrew before the Republican Party primary. In his campaign's responses to a Ballotpedia survey done in 2019, Tarrio listed criminal justice reform, protection of the Second Amendment, countering domestic terrorism, ending the war on drugs, free speech on digital platforms, and immigration reform among his priorities.

Arrests 
In 2004, when he was 20 years old, Tarrio was convicted of theft. He was sentenced to community service and three years of probation and was ordered to pay restitution.

In 2013, Tarrio was sentenced to 30 months (of which he served 16) in federal prison for rebranding and reselling stolen diabetes test strips.

According to a January 2021 Reuters report, between 2012 and 2014 Tarrio had been an informant to both federal and local law enforcement; in a 2014 federal court hearing, Tarrio's lawyer said that Tarrio had been a "prolific" cooperator who had assisted the government in the investigation and prosecution of more than twelve people in cases involving anabolic steroids, gambling, and human smuggling; had helped identify three "grow houses" where marijuana was cultivated; and had repeatedly worked undercover to aid in investigations. Tarrio denied working undercover or cooperating with prosecutions, but the court transcript contradicted the denial, and the former federal prosecutor in the proceeding against Tarrio confirmed that he cooperated.

On January 4, 2021, Tarrio was arrested by Washington, D.C. police and charged with one misdemeanor count of destruction of property in connection with the burning of a Black Lives Matter banner stolen from a Washington, D.C. church during a pro-Trump march on December 12, 2020, that drew around 200 Proud Boys. Tarrio acknowledged that he had burned the banner, but denied that the act was a hate crime. A statement released by African Methodist Episcopal Church, which was one of two historically Black churches in D.C. targeted on December 12, said that the church had sued Tarrio and the Proud Boys organization. Tarrio was also charged with two felony counts of possession of a high capacity feeding device after two high-capacity firearms magazines were found on Tarrio when he was arrested. His request to be allowed to have Bevelyn Beatty, a Black Christian activist who was herself accused of defacing a Black Lives Matter mural, to testify for him as a character witness was summarily denied. As a condition of his release on bail on January 5, 2021, Tarrio was banned from entering Washington except for trial or meeting with his lawyers.

January 6 United States Capitol attack 
The FBI later said they had arrested Tarrio in an attempt to prevent the 2021 United States Capitol attack.
On July 19, 2021, Tarrio pleaded guilty to a destruction of property charge and a reduced charge of attempting to possess a high-capacity ammunition feeding device.

On August 23, 2021, Tarrio received a 155-day prison sentence, more than the 90 days requested by Department of Justice prosecutors. Tarrio began serving his sentence on September 6, 2021. His November 2021 request for early release based on poor living conditions in the D.C. Jail was denied.

By November 2021, at least two dozen Proud Boys members and affiliates had been indicted for their alleged roles in the 2021 United States Capitol attack. Tarrio and the Proud Boys were subpoenaed by the House Select Committee on the January 6 Attack in November 2021 relating to the organization's alleged involvement.

In March 2022, Tarrio was indicted on a conspiracy charge by the Justice Department for his involvement in organizing the January 6 attack. On June 6, 2022, the Justice Department announced that Tarrio and four other members had been indicted on more serious seditious conspiracy charges.

On December 19, 2022, the trial of Tarrio and four co-defendants began after U.S. District Judge Timothy Kelly denied defense attorneys’ last-minute bid to delay jury selection. The trial has continuously been plagued by delays due to on-going disagreements between Tarrio's legal team and the Judge Kelly, including multiple requests for the case to be declared a mistrial.

Personal life 
Tarrio is of Cuban heritage and identifies as Afro-Cuban. He is divorced.

References

External links 
 

1980s births
Living people
Activists from Florida
Candidates in the 2020 United States elections
Critics of Black Lives Matter
American people of Cuban descent
American neo-fascists
Businesspeople from Florida
Florida Republicans
People from Miami
People of Afro–Cuban descent
Police informants
Proud Boys
Year of birth unknown
People criminally charged for acts during the January 6 United States Capitol attack